Campus climate refers to current dimensions of climate in the campus community in higher education institutions. According to the author, the dimensions of climate could refer to views, attitudes, psychology, behaviors, standards, perceptions and expectations. Campus community could refer to employees such as faculty, staff, administrators, and students, individually or as a group. Campus climate is often contrasted with 'campus culture'. While climate and culture are sometimes used interchangeably, some authors mention overlaps, while others define clear boundaries between the two.

Definitions and descriptions 
Huston Smith (1955) wrote that the "atmosphere" and "environment" of a college affects everyone that is a part of it, making an educational institute more than a group of students, employees and buildings. Early attempts at measuring campus climate (culture, atmosphere, environment) include assessments and indexes created by John L. Holland & Alexander Astin (1961), and George G. Stern & C. Robert Pace (1962). More recently, climate has been understood to represent an "immeasurable construct".  studied 118 campus climate papers and identified a number of definitions and measurement efforts.

Climate is a broad concept however often used in a narrower and more concentrated manner. Conceptual framework for campus climate has developed to include the history of the educational institute, capacity to handle diversity, and psychological and behavioral climate.

Campus climate for the campus community

Faculty 
Women colleges and universities around the world provide a friendly and "warm" to "neutral" climate. Campus climate at women's colleges for female faculty is more conducive than at coeducational institutions. The climate situation in coeducational settings for female faculty is similar to the situation for female students, say with regard to male privilege. Intellectual inbreeding in China, Japan and Korea is affected by the old boy networks; in this respect women colleges and universities provide opportunities which coeducational institutions do not.

Research from around the world

Campus climate in Brazil 
A study conducted at Federal University of Bahia observed that a number of campus climate variables affected students in general, and more importantly variables that went on to affect their interaction with their academic life and retention. This includes identity, teaching and faculty interactions.

Campus climate in India 
One of the first studies in India which included the aspect of campus climate was conducted in the University of Pune from 2013 onwards. The study found that faculty demographics and student demographics has changed unequally and this has a significant factor of campus climate. The study also revealed changing gender patterns which also have implications for campus climate. Changes in the gender gap include increased access to higher education for women from "relatively privileged backgrounds" and males from "disadvantaged backgrounds". This kind of changing social dynamic has resulted in observations such as men reporting experiencing more discrimination than women. Low empathy, low tolerance and low argumentation skills were observed.

Campus climate in Turkey 
Gunuc & Artun et al (2019) conducted a campus climate study of 26 universities in Turkey covering all the geographic regions of the country. The study found that the correlation between student engagement and campus climate along with certain other variables was significant.

Campus climate in United States 
Climate for free speech in USA campuses has been studied. More than half of college students self-censor themselves and there is a large variation between institutions with regard to free speech. There is a discussion about cancel culture and wokeness on the left. Campus climate is an important factor that affects decisions to seek out mental health services for mental health issues.

See also 

 Organisation climate
 University student retention
 Learning community

References

Works cited 
(Sorted by year)

Further reading 

 
 

Academic culture
Higher education
Educational personnel
Education